Vittorio Siri or Francesco Siri (1608–1685) was an Italian mathematician, monk and historian.

Life 
Siri was born in Parma, and studied at the Benedictine convent of San Giovanni Evangelista, Parma, where he pronounced his vows on December 25, 1625. At first, he specialized in geometry, and taught mathematics in Venice. There he befriended the French ambassador and took a liking to political matters.

In 1640, Siri published a book about the occupation of Casale Monferrato (Il politico soldato Monferrino) defending the French position. This earned him the patronage of Cardinal Richelieu, who granted him access to the French archives. Based on what he found in the archives, Siri set up to publish Il Mercurio overo historia de' correnti tempi  ('Mercury, or the History of Current Times'), a monumental work in 15 volumes, published in Venice between 1644 and 1682 and translated into French by Jean Baptiste Requier. Besides the Mercurio Politico Siri wrote another historical work, entitled Memorie Recondite, which fills eight volumes. Both these works contain a vast number of valuable authentic documents. 

In 1648 Genoese historian and polygraph Giovanni Battista Birago Avogadro offended Siri  by publishing a survey of Europe in the year 1642 which he called Mercurio veridico, an undisguised slight of the latter's Mercurio, whose second volume appeared that same year. The affront was answered by Siri in 1653 with a whole book that enumerated Birago's mistakes and charged him with dishonesty (Bollo di D. Vittorio Siri).

Cardinal Mazarin honored Siri with a pension and the title of Counsellor of State, chaplain and historian of the king of France. Siri therefore moved to France in 1649 and from 1655 he lived at the court. In the meanwhile he served as the representative in France of the duke of Parma and wrote newsletters for that duke as well as for the rival duke of Modena. He died in Paris on 6 October 1685.

Works 
 Problemata et theoremata geometrica et mecanica, Bologna, 1633.
 
Il politico Soldato Monferrino, ovvero discorso politico sopra gli affari di Casale published under the pseudonym Capitano Latino Verità, Casale (Venice), 1640.
Il Mercurio overo historia de' correnti tempi in 15 volumes in-4°, 1644–1682.
Memorie recondite in 8 volumes in-4°, 1676-79.

Bibliography

References

External links 
 
 

17th-century Italian mathematicians
Italian Christian monks
1608 births
1685 deaths
17th-century Italian historians